LoveRance (born Rance Love Oliver II) is an American rapper, producer and DJ from the San Francisco Bay Area. He is best known for his 2011 hit single "Up!" featuring 50 Cent and produced by Iamsu!. "Up!" hit number 46 on the US Billboard Hot 100 and number two on the Rap charts.

Music video 
The music video for LoveRance's hit single "UP!" was uploaded to his Vevo account on January 31, 2012. The video takes place in the Bay Area and most of the video is recorded inside a night club.

https://www.youtube.com/user/LoveRanceRadio

https://www.youtube.com/user/LoveRanceVEVO

Discography

Mixtapes

Singles

References 

1989 births
Living people
African-American male rappers
African-American record producers
American hip hop record producers
American hip hop singers
American hip hop DJs
Interscope Records artists
Rappers from the San Francisco Bay Area
West Coast hip hop musicians
21st-century American rappers
21st-century American male musicians
21st-century African-American musicians
20th-century African-American people